Arthur Perry (11 February 1840 – 21 April 1898) was a New Zealand cricketer. He played in one first-class match for Canterbury in 1877/78.

See also
 List of Canterbury representative cricketers

References

External links
 

1840 births
1898 deaths
New Zealand cricketers
Canterbury cricketers
Cricketers from Hobart